Kartanonherra ja kaunis Kirstin (Finnish: The Lord of the Mansion and the Beautiful Kirstin) is a historical novel by Finnish author Kaari Utrio.

1968 novels
Novels by Kaari Utrio
Novels set in the 16th century
Tammi (company) books
20th-century Finnish novels
Finnish historical novels